Under Stars is the fourth album by Scottish singer-songwriter Amy Macdonald, and was released on 17 February 2017. The album's lead single, "Dream On", was released on 6 January 2017. Macdonald's official website and official Facebook fanpage confirmed the album for release on 25 November 2016. Album title and tracklist were confirmed the same day by both sites.

Background
Macdonald began writing songs for the album in early 2014, two years after the release of Life in a Beautiful Light. In May 2014, she performed four new songs live. She also sang "Leap of Faith" during the Scottish independence referendum in September 2014. In March 2015, Macdonald announced via Twitter she was finishing the songwriting of the album, but had not yet started recording. On 28 October 2015, she announced via Twitter she started the recording sessions for the album. Later, she stated on 9 December 2015 via her Instagram account that she had finished the songwriting for the album and that she hoped the album would be finished sometime in 2016. On 9 August 2016, Macdonald announced via Instagram her fourth album was finished and would be released early 2017.

Macdonald said although it was two and a half years in the making, which is the longest she has ever taken with an album, she was glad to have taken the time and she feels the album has "the TLC that it deserves".

Critical reception 

The album up to now has gathered mixed to positive reviews, receiving a score of 3 out of 5 stars at the London Evening Standard, describing the album as "a tuneful collection that doesn't mess with the formula".

Singles
"Dream On" was released as the lead single from the album on 6 January 2017. The song has peaked to number 37 on the Scottish Singles Chart. The song also charted in Belgium.

"Automatic" was released as the second single off the album on 24 March 2017. The accompanying music video was released on her Vevo channel on 17 March 2017.

"Down by the Water" was released as the third single from the album on 11 July 2017, on the same day as the accompanying music video. An acoustic version of the song was previously released in late 2016 as a promotional single from the album before its release.

Track listings

Standard edition

Deluxe edition

Super deluxe box set
A super deluxe box set was also released that contains:

 Deluxe edition of the album
 DVD of 8 live acoustic versions
 4 art images (one signed by Macdonald)
 Handwritten printed lyric sheets
 Embossed black envelope

Charts

Weekly charts

Year-end charts

Certifications

References

External links
 Amy Macdonald Official site
 Amy Macdonald on YouTube 

Amy Macdonald albums
Mercury Records albums